Mark Jenkins (born May 8, 1943) is an American actor. He portrayed the title character in the short-lived 1972 television series Young Dr. Kildare. One of his film portrayals was that of Lt. Shawn (Piedmont Team) Stone in the film adaptation of Michael Crichton's The Andromeda Strain (1971).

Filmography

References

External links
 

American male film actors
Living people
1943 births
Male actors from Butte, Montana
Male actors from Montana
American male television actors